Yuri Igorevich Ivanov (born 8 August 1960) is a former Russian football player.

References

1960 births
Living people
Soviet footballers
PFC CSKA Moscow players
FC Kairat players
FC Ordabasy players
FC Irtysh Pavlodar players
Daugava Rīga players
Turun Palloseura footballers
Soviet expatriate footballers
Expatriate footballers in Finland
Russian footballers
FC Kuban Krasnodar players
Russian Premier League players
Russian expatriate footballers
Footballers from Moscow
Association football defenders
FC Spartak Moscow players
FC Dynamo Vologda players
FC Znamya Truda Orekhovo-Zuyevo players